Bheemavaram is a village in Khammam district of the Indian state of Telangana. It is located in Yerrupalem mandal of Khammam revenue division.

Geography 

References 

Villages in Khammam district